World Series Baseball II is a video game developed and published by Sega for the Sega Saturn.

Gameplay
World Series Baseball II is a baseball game which features every major league stadium, and arcade-style pitching.

Reception
Next Generation reviewed the Saturn version of the game, rating it five stars out of five, and stated that "There's no baseball game that looks, plays, or feels as good as WSB II.  The graphics are so crisp and clean that it makes the competitors look like 16-bit games.  The two-player game is incredible and, while the one-player game may lack some sim options, the speed of play enables you to get through a season without becoming bored.  A must for any baseball fan, WSB II is at the top of the year's baseball line-up."

Reviews
Electronic Gaming Monthly - Nov, 1996

References

1996 video games
Sega Saturn games
Sega Saturn-only games
Video games developed in Japan
World Series Baseball video games